Pristimantis ardalonychus is a species of frog in the family Strabomantidae. It is endemic to Peru where it is only known from the region of its type locality near Rioja, Rioja Province, in the San Martín Region of northern central Peru.
Its natural habitats are lower humid montane forests. It is threatened by habitat loss.

References

ardalonychus
Endemic fauna of Peru
Amphibians of Peru
Frogs of South America
Amphibians described in 1999
Taxonomy articles created by Polbot